Ever Reviled Records was a record label founded by Darren Deicide.

Ever Reviled Records was founded in 1998 and has released albums by David Rovics, Darren Deicide, The Old Man and his Po Buckra, Nathan Carpenter, Cuomo!, Hopeless Dregs of Humanity, Give Us Barabbas, Thought Breakers and Rational Solution.

See also
 List of record labels

References

American record labels
Cooperatives in the United States
Alternative rock record labels
Record labels established in 2000